Hal B. Burton was a state legislator in Arkansas. He represented Jefferson County, Arkansas in the Arkansas House of Representatives in 1887. He was a Republican.

See also
African-American officeholders during and following the Reconstruction era

References

Politicians from Jefferson County, Arkansas
Republican Party members of the Arkansas House of Representatives
19th-century American politicians
African-American state legislators in Arkansas
Year of birth missing
Year of death missing